Nicholas Whitney  Tucci (April 3, 1981 – March 3, 2020) was an American actor.

Early life
Tucci was a Middletown, Connecticut, native, born in 1981. He attended Middletown High School in his hometown, and earned a bachelor's degree in theatre from Yale University in 2004.

Career
Tucci appeared in the films Undocumented (2010), Choose (2011), You're Next (2011), The Worst Year of My Life (2015), Most Beautiful Island (2017), The Ranger (2018), and Long Lost (2018). His television appearances included roles on Daredevil, Homeland, Pose, and Quantico. Tucci voiced characters in the video games Wolfenstein: The New Order and Wolfenstein II: The New Colossus.

Death
Tucci died at the Smilow Cancer Hospital in New Haven, Connecticut on March 3, 2020, after a private battle with cancer.

References

1981 births
2020 deaths
21st-century American male actors
American male film actors
American male television actors
People from Middletown, Connecticut
Male actors from Connecticut
Yale University alumni
American male video game actors